Hesychotypa avrillasi is a species of beetle in the family Cerambycidae. It was described by Audureau in 2013.

References

avrillasi
Beetles described in 2013